Sundaresh Menon  (born 26 February 1962) is a Singaporean judge who has been serving as the fourth chief justice of Singapore since 2012. He was appointed by President Tony Tan, and took office on 6 November 2012. He was the first chief justice to be born in Singapore.

Education
Sundaresh graduated from the National University of Singapore in 1986  with a Bachelor of Laws with first class honours degree. He subsequently went on to complete a Master of Laws degree at Harvard Law School in 1991.

Career
Sundaresh started his career at Shook Lin & Bok as a legal assistant in 1987, and became a partner in 1990. In 1992, together with Wong Meng Meng and Alvin Yeo, Sundaresh co-founded WongPartnership, one of the four largest law firms in Singapore, and remained a partner in the law firm until 1995. He then joined Rajah & Tann as a partner and served as its Head of Projects & Infrastructure Group until 2003, and thereafter joined Jones Day as a partner until 2006.

Sundaresh served a one-year term as a Judicial Commissioner of the Supreme Court between 2006 and 2007. Returning to legal practice with Rajah & Tann after this, he was appointed Senior Counsel on 5 January 2008, and became its managing partner in August 2009.

He has served as Deputy Chairman of the Singapore International Arbitration Centre, a member of the Senate of the Singapore Academy of Law, and Chairman of the Advisory Board for the Singapore Management University School of Law.

Sundaresh was appointed Attorney-General on 1 October 2010, where he served until 25 June 2012. He was subsequently appointed a Judge of the Court of Appeal on 1 August 2012. 

On 6 November 2012, he was appointed as the fourth chief justice of Singapore. He was the first chief justice to be born in Singapore.

References

1962 births
Attorneys-General of Singapore
Singaporean people of Indian descent
Singaporean people of Malayali descent
Harvard Law School alumni
Indian diaspora in Singapore
Living people
National University of Singapore alumni
Malayali people
20th-century Singaporean lawyers
Singaporean Roman Catholics
Singaporean Senior Counsel
Chief justices of Singapore
21st-century Singaporean judges